The IX Bolivarian Games (Spanish: Juegos Bolivarianos) were a multi-sport event held between December 4–14, 1981, at the Estadio de Barquisimeto in Barquisimeto, Venezuela. The Games were organized by the Bolivarian Sports Organization (ODEBO).  In February 1980, Barquisimeto was chosen to substitute the initial host city
Lima in Perú.  The Comité Olímpico Peruano renounced
because of financial problems.

The Games were officially opened by Venezuelan president Luís Herrera Campins.  Torch lighter was fencer Carmen Militza Pérez.

A detailed history of the early editions of the Bolivarian Games between 1938 and 1989 was published in a book written (in Spanish) by José Gamarra Zorrilla, former president of the Bolivian Olympic Committee, and first president (1976-1982) of ODESUR.  Gold medal winners from Ecuador were published by the Comité Olímpico Ecuatoriano.

A critical comment was published.

Participation 
A total of 1516 athletes from 6 countries were reported to participate:

Sports 
The following 18 sports were explicitly mentioned:

Aquatic sports 
 Diving
 Swimming
 Athletics
 Baseball
 Basketball
 Bowling
 Boxing
Cycling 
 Road cycling
 Track cycling
 Fencing
 Football
 Gymnastics (artistic)
 Judo
 Shooting
 Softball
 Table tennis
 Tennis
 Volleyball
 Weightlifting
 Wrestling

Medal count
The medal count for these games is tabulated below. This table is sorted by the number of gold medals earned by each country.  The number of silver medals is taken into consideration next, and then the number of bronze medals.

References

Bolivarian Games
B
Bolivarian Games
B
Bolivarian Games, 1981
Sport in Barquisimeto
Multi-sport events in Venezuela
December 1981 sports events in South America